Alcidion aestimabilis is a species of longhorn beetles of the subfamily Lamiinae. It was described by Melzer in 1934, and is known from Brazil.

References

Beetles described in 1934
Endemic fauna of Brazil
Alcidion